Joffre James "Jeff" Cross (August 28, 1918 – July 23, 1997) was an American professional baseball infielder who appeared in 119 games over all or parts of four seasons (1942 and 1946–1948) in Major League Baseball for the St. Louis Cardinals and Chicago Cubs.

Cross's professional career began in 1938 in the Cardinals' farm system. His first MLB game came on the last day of the  National League season. He started at shortstop in the second game of a doubleheader for the World Series-bound Cardinals after they had clinched the league pennant with a victory in the opening game of that day's twin bill. Cross collected one hit in four at bats against the Cubs' Claude Passeau and played errorless ball in the field, as St. Louis won, 4–1, to increase the Redbirds' final margin to two full games ahead of the Brooklyn Dodgers. He then served in the United States Navy during World War II, missing three baseball seasons (1943–1945). He batted only .217 and .102 respectively, and did not play in the 1946 World Series, won by the Cardinals in seven games over the Boston Red Sox. He spent the balance of the year with the Double-A Shreveport Sports before retiring from baseball.

Altogether, Cross was credited with 23 hits (including four doubles) and ten runs batted in in the major leagues, batting .162 lifetime.

After his retirement from professional baseball, Cross managed the Houston Little League team to the 1950 Little League World Series championship.

References

External links 
, or Retrosheet

1918 births
1997 deaths
Baseball players from Oklahoma
Chicago Cubs players
Houston Buffaloes players
Major League Baseball infielders
Mobile Shippers players
New Iberia Cardinals players
Rochester Red Wings players
St. Louis Cardinals players
Shreveport Sports players
Sportspeople from Tulsa, Oklahoma
United States Navy personnel of World War II